Kahur Ryis Abbas (also Romanized as Kahūr Ryīs ʿAbbās; also known as Kahūr Reesabbās) is a village in Jaghin-e Shomali Rural District, Jaghin District, Rudan County, Hormozgan Province, Iran. At the 2006 census, its population was 94, in 24 families.

References 

Populated places in Rudan County